"If You Can Put That in a Bottle" is a 1967 song by Wilbur Meshel performed by Peter Doyle.

Swedish singer Lill Lindfors released a Swedish version, "En man i byrån", with lyrics by Peter Himmelstrand in 1969. With the song, she scored a Svensktoppen hit for 14 weeks between 7 December-18 March 1970, topping the chart.

For many years, Lill Lindfors refused to perform the song, since many people thought of it as a dildo-metaphor.

Swedish singer Agnetha Fältskog recorded the song with German lyrics as "Ein kleiner Mann in einer Flasche" and released it as a single on the Western German market in 1970.

References 

1967 songs
Lill Lindfors songs
Agnetha Fältskog songs